Die Herbstzeitlosen (German Meadow saffron) may refer to:
 Used People, American film directed by Beeban Kidron
 Late Bloomers (2006 film), 2006 Swiss film directed by Bettina Oberli